On 15 November 2022, a missile struck the territory of Poland at the village of Przewodów near the border with Ukraine. The incident occurred during an attack on Ukrainian cities and energy facilities by Russia. It was the first incident of a missile (vis-a-vis prior UAV incursions) landing and exploding within NATO territory during the 2022 Russian invasion of Ukraine. Initial assessments by the United States found that the missile was likely to have been an air defence missile fired by Ukrainian forces at an incoming Russian missile.

Background

The explosion happened on a day when the Russian military extensively bombarded infrastructure all over Ukraine, the largest-scale attack so far. According to the Ukrainian Air Force Command, the Russian military launched 96 pieces of various types of weapons at Ukraine on 15 November. These included air and sea cruise missiles (Kh-555 and Kh-101, and Kalibr), Kh-59 guided missiles, Geran-1 and -2 attack drones, and Orlan-10 and Orion UAVs. According to Forbes, one Kalibr alone costs $6.5 million, and the Kh-101 missile costs $13 million. The Economic Pravda or Epravda calculated that Russia had spent between half a billion and a billion U.S. dollars worth of weaponry in the 15 November 2022 attack on Ukraine.

Explosion
Polish media reported that two people (Bogusław Wos and Bogdan Ciupek) were killed in an explosion at a grain dryer. Polish officials stated that the cause of the explosion was unknown. Polish radio station Radio ZET reported that two stray rockets fell on the village, causing the explosion, although later reports indicated that there was only one missile. NATO members started to review the evidence soon after the explosion was reported.

Investigation
After the meeting of the National Security Bureau on 15 November, the government spokesman said: "The services will work all night to sort things out".

Conflicting reports emerged regarding the origin and nature of the explosion(s) shortly after the incident. Poland's Ministry of Foreign Affairs stated that the projectile was "Russian-produced". Andrés Gannon, a security expert at the think tank Council on Foreign Relations, speculated that the missiles could be from S-300 systems. S-300s were used by both combatants during the invasion both as surface-to-air and surface-to-surface missiles, primarily by Ukraine and Russia respectively. Mariusz Gierszewski, a Polish reporter for Radio ZET, reported sources claiming the missile was the remains of a downed rocket. U.S. president Joe Biden, speaking from the G20 summit in Bali, said that it was "unlikely" that the missile was fired from Russia.

According to US intelligence officials, initial assessments suggest that the missile was probably launched by Ukrainian forces at an incoming Russian missile.

On 17 November, Head of the Polish International Policy Bureau Jakub Kumoch gave a similar explanation that an air defence missile failed to shoot down the Russian target it sought to intercept; then "[t]he self-destruct system did not work, and this missile led to a tragedy."

Also on 17 November, Polish officials stated that Ukrainian investigators were likely to be granted access to the site of the explosion.

On 21 November, it was reported that Ukraine will not be granted access to the investigation by the Polish prosecutor's office.

Reactions

Poland
After the explosion, Prime Minister of Poland Mateusz Morawiecki called an urgent meeting of a committee for national security and defence affairs. A government spokesperson said that Poland was raising the alert level of some of its military units after the conclusion of the meeting. He also stated that Polish President Andrzej Duda spoke to Secretary General of NATO Jens Stoltenberg regarding the possibility of activating Article 4 of the NATO charter.

Polish foreign minister Zbigniew Rau reportedly summoned the Russian ambassador and demanded "immediate detailed explanations".

Polish president Andrzej Duda stated late on 15 November local time that there was no evidence of who fired the missile.

International

Russia
The Russian defence ministry denied reports that Russian missiles had hit Poland, labeling it as "deliberate provocation aimed at escalating the situation".

Later that day, the Russian foreign ministry summoned the Polish ambassador.

Ukraine
President Volodymyr Zelenskyy blamed Russia for the incident in his nightly video address that day, saying that "Russian missiles hit Poland" and describing it as an infringement upon "collective security" and as a "significant escalation". Around the same time, foreign minister Dmytro Kuleba labeled the suggestion of the missile being fired by Ukrainian air defense as a "conspiracy theory" promoted by Russia.

The next day, Ukraine's presidential adviser Mykhailo Podolyak had tweeted that European countries should "close the sky" over Ukraine after the blast. Oleksiy Danilov, the secretary of the National Security and Defense Council of Ukraine, claimed that Ukraine had evidence of a "Russian trace" in the explosion, without giving any details. Zelenskyy also said that he had "no doubt that it was not our missile" and that Ukraine should be given access to the site of the explosion.

On 17 November, Zelenskyy said: "I don’t know what happened. We don’t know for sure. The world does not know. But I am sure that there was a Russian missile, I am sure that we fired from air defense systems".

NATO officials and member countries
Due to this incident, compounded with the closure of the Druzhba pipeline, the Hungarian government led by Prime Minister Viktor Orbán also called an emergency meeting with its Defence Council on the same night, and Defense Minister Kristóf Szalay-Bobrovniczky had a telephone conversation with NATO Secretary General Jens Stoltenberg.

Shortly after the alleged strike, the United States Department of Defense acknowledged reports that two Russian missiles struck a location inside Poland near its Ukrainian border, though it could not confirm them. Bob Menendez, Senate Foreign Relations Chair, expressed the hope that Russia would "apologize quickly for the loss of life and express that it wasn’t intentional", and warned of "all sorts of consequences", including the possibility of invoking Article 5, if the strike was intentional.

Poland requested a NATO meeting on Wednesday, 16 November, on the basis of Article 4. NATO diplomats said that the alliance would act cautiously and needed time to verify exactly how the incident happened.

Estonian Minister of Foreign Affairs Urmas Reinsalu responded to the reports by tweeting that Estonia was ready to defend "every inch" of NATO territory. Belgian Prime Minister Alexander De Croo responded to the reports by saying "We stand with Poland." Czech Prime Minister Petr Fiala tweeted that if the strikes were confirmed to be an intentional act, "it would "be a further escalation by Russia." Romanian President Klaus Iohannis tweeted that Romania stands "in full solidarity with our friend and ally Poland" and that "we are in contact with our partners and allies".

Stoltenberg stated that Russia bears the blame, although the missile was most likely a Ukrainian air defense system or missile. After all "this would not have happened if Russia did not fire these missiles," he stated.

Others
 President of the European Council Charles Michel stated that he was "shocked" by the reports of the incident, adding that "we stand with Poland", which is a member of the European Union (EU).

 The Ministry of Foreign Affairs and European Integration of Moldova expressed solidarity with Poland after the explosions and said that it was in contact with the Polish authorities. Moldovan foreign minister Nicu Popescu sent to Zbigniew Rau, his Polish counterpart, condolences for the families of the victims. An event similar to the missile strike in Poland had occurred in the Moldovan village of Naslavcea earlier on 31 October, when as a result of another wave of Russian missiles against Ukraine, one of them was taken down by Ukrainian air defence systems and it crashed into the village, causing material damages but no casualties.

Related incident
On 5 December, as Russia launched another wave of targeted missile strikes against Ukraine, another missile fell within the territory of Moldova, near the city of Briceni. Russian military expert Alexei Leonkov claimed that this and the incident at Przewodów were similar and that the missile in both cases originated from a S-300 missile system. A third missile would fall into the Moldovan village of Larga on 14 January 2023.

See also

 2022 Zagreb Tu-141 crash

References

2022 in international relations
November 2022 events in Poland
Airstrikes during the 2022 Russian invasion of Ukraine
Explosions in 2022
2022 controversies
Explosions in Poland
History of Lublin Voivodeship
Hrubieszów County
Poland–Russia relations
Poland–Ukraine relations
Poland–NATO relations
Russia–NATO relations
Ukraine–NATO relations
Poland–Ukraine border